North Murderkill Hundred is a hundred in Kent County, Delaware, United States. North Murderkill Hundred was formed in 1855 from Murderkill Hundred. Its primary community is Camden.

References

External links
 North Murderkill Hundred, 

Hundreds in Kent County, Delaware